Somaliland National Television (SLNTV) is a Somali television channel. It is the official public service station of the government of Somaliland.  Founded in 2005, it broadcasts from the country's capital of Hargeisa via terrestrial transmission, as well as to other parts of Africa and the Middle East, and Europe and Asia through satellite. The channel focuses on general Somali news, particularly items on the regional authorities. It also carries sports, entertainment and humanitarian programs.

See also

Media of Somaliland
Horn Cable Television
Somali Broadcasting Corporation
Universal Television (Somalia)

References

Public television
Television channels in Somaliland
2005 establishments in Somaliland
Television channels and stations established in 2005